The 2023 WAFF U-16 Girls Championship was the third edition of the WAFF U-16 Girls Championship (including previous editions of the WAFF U-15 Girls Championship), the biennial international youth football championship organised by West Asian Football Federation (WAFF) for the women's under-16 national teams of West Asia.

It was held in Aqaba, Jordan between 4 and 10 January 2023. A total of four teams competed in the tournament. Lebanon were the defending champions, having won the previous edition in 2019.

Participating nations
Four teams entered the 2022 WAFF U-16 Girls Championship. Bahrain returned to the tournament after missing the 2019 edition. Jordan, Lebanon and Palestine kept their record of appearing in all WAFF U-16 Girls Championships.

Venues
On 14 December 2022, WAFF confirmed that Al-Aqaba Stadium would host the tournament matches.

Draw
The official draw took place on 20 December 2022, 11:00 local time AST (UTC+3) at the WAFF Headquarters in Amman, Jordan.

Draw result
The draw resulted in the following order.

Match officials
Referees

  Haneen Murad
  Doumouh Al Bakkar 

Assistant referees

  Amal Jama Badhafari
  Islam Al-Abadi

Group stage
All times are local, AST (UTC+3).

Knockout stage

Third place play-off

Final

Goalscorers

References

U16 2022
WAFF U16
WAFF U16
International association football competitions hosted by Jordan
WAFF U16